Lisette Morelos (born Lisette Garcia Morelos-Zaragoza on May 21, 1978, in Mexico City, Mexico) is a Mexican actress, singer and model. She started her career at a young age. She attended the Centro de Educación Artística (CEA). Her first Telenovela was at the age of 17 in Tu y Yo with Maribel Guardia and Joan Sebastian.

She lives in Canada. She has been involved in Telenovelas, with Miguel de León, Eduardo Verastegui, Eduardo Capetillo, Gabriel Soto, and many more. She has also appeared in many shows.

Filmography

Awards and nominations

References

External links

Lisette Morelos at the esmas.com

1978 births
Living people
Mexican child actresses
Mexican telenovela actresses
Mexican television actresses
Mexican female models
20th-century Mexican actresses
21st-century Mexican actresses
Actresses from Mexico City
Singers from Mexico City
People from Mexico City
21st-century Mexican singers
21st-century Mexican women singers
Mexican emigrants to Canada